Hua Hin Municipal Stadium (known as Khao Takiap Stadium) is a multi-purpose stadium in Hua Hin District, Prachuap Khiri Khan Province, Thailand. It is currently used mostly for football matches and is the home stadium of Hua Hin City. The stadium holds 3,000 people.

Football venues in Thailand
Multi-purpose stadiums in Thailand
Buildings and structures in Prachuap Khiri Khan province
Sport in Prachuap Khiri Khan province